The School of Biological Sciences is a constituent body of the Faculty of Science at the University of Sydney, Australia.

References

External links
 School of Biological Sciences at the Faculty of Science, University of Sydney

Biological Sciences, School of